Tactusa tranumi is a moth of the family Erebidae first described by Michael Fibiger in 2010. It is known from northern Vietnam.

The wingspan is about 12 mm. The forewing has a large black triangle, the costa is black throughout, only interrupted by white marks indicating crosslines. These crosslines are present but indistinct, white and narrow. Even the terminal line is white. The fringes are blackish. The hindwing is dark grey, with an indistinct discal spot and the underside is unicolorous grey.

References

Micronoctuini
Taxa named by Michael Fibiger
Moths described in 2010